Martin Modlitba (born 12 January 1970) is a Slovak gymnast. He competed in Gymnastics at the 1992 Summer Olympics at the 1992 Summer Olympics in Barcelona.

References

1970 births
Living people
Slovak male artistic gymnasts
Olympic gymnasts of Czechoslovakia
Gymnasts at the 1992 Summer Olympics
Sportspeople from Banská Bystrica